Lawrence Edward DePalma (born October 27, 1965 in Trenton, Michigan) is an American former  professional ice hockey player who played for the Minnesota North Stars, San Jose Sharks and Pittsburgh Penguins of the National Hockey League. As a youth, he played in the 1978 Quebec International Pee-Wee Hockey Tournament with a minor ice hockey team from Detroit.

Career statistics

Awards
 WHL East Second All-Star Team – 1986

References

External links

1965 births
American men's ice hockey left wingers
American people of Italian descent
Atlanta Knights players
Baltimore Skipjacks players
Cleveland Lumberjacks players
Ice hockey players from Michigan
Kalamazoo Wings (1974–2000) players
Kansas City Blades players
Las Vegas Thunder players
Living people
Milwaukee Admirals (IHL) players
Minnesota Moose players
Minnesota North Stars players
New Westminster Bruins players
People from Trenton, Michigan
Pittsburgh Penguins players
Salt Lake Golden Eagles (IHL) players
San Diego Gulls (IHL) players
San Jose Sharks players
Saskatoon Blades players
Springfield Indians players
Undrafted National Hockey League players